This page lists the incorporated cities and towns of the province of Newfoundland and Labrador, Canada by population.

Cities 
The following is a list of the incorporated cities in Newfoundland and Labrador by population as of the Canada 2011 Census.

Towns 
The following is a list of the incorporated towns in Newfoundland and Labrador as of the Canada 2011 Census by population.

References